The 1956 Dixie Classic was a mid-season college basketball tournament held December 27–29, 1956 at NC State's Reynolds Coliseum in Raleigh, North Carolina. It was the eighth iteration of the Dixie Classic and it was part of the 1956–57 NCAA University Division men's basketball season.

Coming into the tournament, there was no clear favorite among the strong field, with reigning champion NC State holding the worst record of any team. Some noted teams were the 8th-ranked West Virginia Mountaineers, the 2nd-ranked North Carolina Tar Heels, and the 13th-ranked Duke Blue Devils. The Mountaineers were considered a serious threat as an undefeated team with two victories over teams in the "Big Four" already; however, no team outside of the Big Four had ever won the Dixie Classic.

In the first round, the Big Four teams swept their invited opponents. West Virginia's undefeated streak fell apart, as they lost all three games to finish last in the tournament. Wake Forest and North Carolina advanced out of the semifinal, and North Carolina won the final by a score of 63–55 to continue their undefeated streak. This streak ultimately lasted through the end of their season, and the Tar Heels would go on to win the NCAA tournament.

Lennie Rosenbluth of North Carolina was voted as the most outstanding player of the tournament. Across North Carolina's three games, he scored 86 points and led the tournament in rebounds, field goals, and free throws. Across the three days of six double-headers, the total attendance was 71,200.

Teams
Each year, the Dixie Classic included the "Big Four" teams (Duke, NC State, North Carolina, and Wake Forest), as well as four other invited teams. The 1956 teams were:
 Wake Forest Demon Deacons
 DePaul Blue Demons
 NC State Wolfpack
 Iowa Hawkeyes
 Duke Blue Devils
 West Virginia Mountaineers
 North Carolina Tar Heels
 Utah Redskins

Bracket

Game log

References

External links
 NC State vs. Duke game video via NC State University Libraries

1956–57 NCAA University Division men's basketball season
1956 in sports in North Carolina
December 1956 sports events in the United States
1956